The 2013 Milan–San Remo was the 104th running of the Milan–San Remo single-day cycling race. For the first time in 31 years, Milan–San Remo was held on a Sunday, after race organisers requested to change and move into line with several of the other Classic races.

A few riders elected not to take the restart, including 's Tom Boonen, who protested against the decision to let all riders rejoin the main group, despite several riders having lost contact before the race was neutralised.

Teams
As Milan–San Remo was a UCI World Tour event, all UCI ProTeams were invited automatically and obligated to send a squad. Originally, eighteen ProTeams were invited to the race, with seven other squads given wildcard places, and as such, would have formed the event's 25-team peloton. Originally admitted to the event as a wildcard,  subsequently regained their ProTour status after an appeal to the Court of Arbitration for Sport. Each of the 25 teams entered eight riders to the race, making up a starting peloton of 200 riders. Among the peloton was the first black South African rider in the race's history, 's Songezo Jim.

The 25 teams that competed in the race were:

Results

References

External links

Milan–San Remo
March 2013 sports events in Italy
Milan–San Remo
Milan–San Remo
2013 in road cycling